Władysław Mazurkiewicz (1871–1933) was a Polish physician and professor at the University of Warsaw.

In May 1901, together with Aleksander Sulkiewicz, he helped Józef Piłsudski escape from a mental hospital in St. Petersburg, Russia, to which Piłsudski had been transferred from the Warsaw Citadel after feigning mental illness.

In 1920, he was appointed Director of the University of Warsaw's  Pharmacy Division of the Faculty of Medicine.  He chaired the national committee which produced the first edition of the Polish Pharmacopoeia.

References

Polish pharmacists
20th-century Polish physicians
Burials at Powązki Cemetery
Recipients of the Cross of Independence
S.M. Kirov Military Medical Academy alumni
People from Volhynian Governorate
1871 births
1933 deaths